David Gregory Cressman (born January 2, 1950) is a Canadian retired ice hockey left winger. He played 85 games in the NHL for the Minnesota North Stars over the 1974–75 and 1975–76 NHL seasons.

Cressman was born in Kitchener, Ontario. He was drafted by the Minnesota North Stars in the fourth round  (48th overall) of the 1970 NHL Amateur Draft, but he did not begin to play professional hockey until after he had completed his university education to become a teacher.

Coaching career
During the 1990s Cressman coached Junior B hockey at the University of Waterloo, and during the 2002-03 season he stepped in to coach nine games for the Odessa Jackalopes (Central Hockey League) while their regular head coach, Don McKee was having heart surgery.

Career statistics

Regular season and playoffs

References

External links
 

1950 births
Living people
Canadian ice hockey left wingers
Ice hockey people from Ontario
Kitchener Rangers players
Minnesota North Stars draft picks
Minnesota North Stars players
New Haven Nighthawks players
Ontario Hockey Association Senior A League (1890–1979) players
Saginaw Gears players
Sportspeople from Kitchener, Ontario